Blechepsin is a rural locality (an aul) and the administrative center of Blechepsinskoye Rural Settlement of Koshekhablsky District, Adygea, Russia. The population of this village was 3084 as of 2018. There are 27 streets.

Geography 
Blechepsin is located 10 km south of Koshekhabl (the district's administrative centre) by road. Ignatyevsky is the nearest rural locality.

Ethnicity 
The aul is inhabited by Adyghes.

References 

Rural localities in Koshekhablsky District